Melainabacteria is a phylum related to Cyanobacteria. Organisms belonging to this phylum have been found in the human gut and various aquatic habitats such as groundwater. By analyzing genomes of Melainabacteria, predictions are possible about the cell structure and metabolic abilities. The bacterial cell is similar to cyanobacteria in being surrounded by two membranes. It differs from cyanobacteria in its ability to move by flagella (like gram-negative flagella), though some members (e.g. Gastranaerophilales) lack flagella. Melainabacteria are not able to perform photosynthesis, but obtain energy by fermentation.

Phylogeny

Classification
 Class "Melainabacteria" Soo et al. 2014 ["Vampirovibrionia"] (ACD20)
 Order "Caenarcanales" corrig. Soo et al. 2014 ["Caenarcaniphilales" Soo et al. 2014]
 Family "Caenarcanaceae" 
 Genus "Ca. Caenarcanum" Soo et al. 2014
 "Ca. C. bioreactoricola" Soo et al. 2014
 Order "Obscuribacterales" Soo et al. 2014
 Family "Obscuribacteraceae" 
 Genus "Ca. Obscuribacter" Soo et al. 2014
 "Ca. O. phosphatis" Soo et al. 2014
 Order "Vampirovibrionales" Soo et al. 2015
 Family "Vampirovibrionaceae" Soo 2015
 Genus Vampirovibrio Gromov & Mamkayeva 1972 ex Gromov & Mamkaeva 1980
 V. chlorellavorus Gromov & Mamkayeva 1972 ex Gromov & Mamkaeva 1980
 Order "Gastranaerophilales" Soo et al. 2014
 Family CAJFVJ01
 Genus "Ca. Adamsella" Glendinning et al. 2020
 "Ca. A. avium" Glendinning et al. 2020
 Family RUG14156
 Genus "Ca. Galligastranaerophilus" Gilroy et al. 2021
 "Ca. G. faecipullorum" Gilroy et al. 2021
 "Ca. G. gallistercoris" Gilroy et al. 2021
 "Ca. G. intestinavium" Gilroy et al. 2021
 "Ca. G. intestinigallinarum" Gilroy et al. 2021
 Family "Gastranaerophilaceae" 
 Genus "Ca. Avigastranaerophilus" Gilroy et al. 2021
 "Ca. A. faecigallinarum" Gilroy et al. 2021
 Genus "Ca. Gastranaerophilus" Soo et al. 2014
 "Ca. G. phascolarctosicola" Soo et al. 2014
 "Ca. G. termiticola" Utami et al. 2018
 Genus "Ca. Limenecus" Gilroy et al. 2021
 "Ca. L. avicola" Gilroy et al. 2021
 Genus "Ca. Scatenecus" Gilroy et al. 2021
 "Ca. S. faecavius" Gilroy et al. 2021
 Genus "Ca. Spyradomonas" Gilroy et al. 2021
 "Ca. S. excrementavium" Gilroy et al. 2021
 Genus "Ca. Stercorousia" Gilroy et al. 2021
 "Ca. S. faecigallinarum" Gilroy et al. 2021
 Genus "Ca. Scatousia" Gilroy et al. 2021
 "Ca. S. excrementigallinarum" Gilroy et al. 2021
 "Ca. S. excrementipullorum" Gilroy et al. 2021

Ecological Niche 
Melainabacteria can be found in a range of environments, including soil, water, and animal habitats. They can be often be found in the gut of humans and in the respiratory tract, oral environments, and skin surface, though rarely. Melainabacteria is often found in natural environments such as groundwater aquifers and lake sediment, as well as soil and bioreactors. Melainabacteria are also found in the aphotic zone of aquatic environments such as lake sediment and aquifers. Cyanobacteria bloom in freshwater systems as  a result of excess nutrients and high temperatures, resulting in a scum on the water surface that resembles spilled paint. Because Melainabacteria and Cyanobacteria are related, it has raised concern because Melainabacteria thrive in groundwater systems. The genomes of Melainabacteria were found to be bigger when found in aquifer systems and algal cultivation ponds than when in the mammalian gut environment.

Origin 
The Great Oxygenation Event (GOE) that occurred 2.4 billion years ago altered the course of life on Earth forever by increasing the abundance of oxygen in the atmosphere. Bacteria that existed before the GEO did not rely on the presence of oxygen as a source for metabolism, such as the billion-year-old Cyanobacteria. Melainabacteria is a close relative to Cyanobacteria, though Melainabacteria diverged and do not photosynthesize. Cyanobacteria produced atmospheric oxygen and supported the development of early plant cells.

Genome 
The genomes of Melainabacteria organisms isolated from ground water indicate that the organism has the capacity to fix nitrogen. Melainabacteria lack linked electron transport chains but have multiple methods to generate a membrane  potential which can then produce ATP via ATP synthase.  They are able to use Fe hydrogenases for  production that can be consumed by other  microorganisms. Melainabacteria from the human gut also synthesize several B and K vitamins, which suggests that these bacteria are beneficial to their host because they are consumed along with plant fibers.

Animal Habitats 
Melainabacteria have been found to potentially play a role in digesting fiber in the human gut, and are more commonly in herbivorous mammals and those with plant-rich diets. Because plant diets require more fiber break-down, Melainabacteria may aid in this digestive function. However, scientists are unsure of why these microbes are in the gut and how they got there. Ongoing studies such as, "The human gut and groundwater harbor non-photosynthetic bacteria belonging to a new candidate phylum sibling to Cyanobacteria," funded by various organizations such as the National Institutes of Health, the David and Lucile Packard Foundation, The Hartwell Foundation, the Arnold and Mabel Beckman Foundation, the U.S. Department of Energy, the European Molecular Biology Organization and the Wellcome Trust.

References

External links
 What Are Cyanobacteria And What Are Its Types?
 Overview of cyanobacteria
 Webserver for Cyanobacteria Research
 CyanoBase

Environmental chemistry
Bacteria phyla
Taxa described in 2013
Candidatus taxa